Al-Khansaa was an online women's magazine launched in 2004 by a Saudi branch of al-Qaeda.

The magazine claimed to have been founded by Saudi leader Abd-al-Aziz al-Muqrin shortly before his death. It offered advice on first aid for wounded family members, how to raise children to believe in Jihad and  physical training for women to prepare for combat.

The magazine was named after Al-Khansaa, an Arab poet and a contemporary of Muhammad.

References

2004 establishments in Saudi Arabia
Magazines established in 2004
Online magazines
Magazines published in Saudi Arabia
Works by al-Qaeda
Women's magazines
Propaganda newspapers and magazines
Magazines with year of disestablishment missing